Đồng Xuân is a rural district (huyện) of Phú Yên province in the South Central Coast region of Vietnam. As of 2003, the district had a population of 59,260. The district covers an area of 1,063 km2. The district capital lies at La Hai.

References

Districts of Phú Yên province